The list of ksars (Arabic: ksour) in Tunisia is established by Herbert Popp and Abdelfettah Kassah and published in their book Les ksour du Sud tunisien : atlas illustré d'un patrimoine culturel in 2010.

It lists 92 ksour, i.e. almost all of the country's buildings – distributed between the governorates of Medenine and Tataouine over an area between Koutine to the north, Ksar Zorgane to the east, Remada to the south and Beni Khedache to the west – except for a few isolated works such as Ksar Sidi Makhlouf, Ksar Morra or Ksar Dhehibat.

Medenine Governorate

Beni Khedache Delegation

Medenine Nord Delegation

Tataouine Governorate

Bir Lahmar Delegation

Ghomrassen Delegation

Smar Delegation

Tataouine Nord Delegation

Tataouine Sud Delegation

References

Bibliography